Robert McWade (January 25, 1872 – January 19, 1938), was an American stage and film actor.

McWade was born in Buffalo, New York. He was the third actor named Robert McWade, after his father and grandfather.

In 1902, McWade debuted on stage with the Murray Hill Stock Company. From 1903 to 1927, he appeared in at least 38 Broadway productions, his last being Devil In The Cheese (1926), with Bela Lugosi and Fredric March.  McWade also appeared in 83 films between 1924 and 1938, for example 42nd Street with Dick Powell and Ruby Keeler (1933). His older brother was character actor Edward McWade.

McWade was married to Minne Lee, and they had two sons.

On January 19, 1938, McWade died of heart disease in Culver City, California, at age 65.

Selected filmography

Second Youth (1924) - Department Store Clerk (uncredited)
New Brooms (1925) - Robert Bates Sr.
The Home Towners (1928) - P. H. Bancroft
The Sins of the Children (1930) - Joe Higginson
Good Intentions (1930) - Cyrus Holt
Night Work (1930) - Phil Reisman
The Pay-Off (1930) - Frank Smiley
Feet First (1930) - John Quincy Tanner
Cimarron (1931) - Louis Hefner
Kept Husbands (1931) - Arthur Parker
It's a Wise Child (1931) - G. A. Appleby
Too Many Cooks (1931) - Uncle George Bennett
New Adventures of Get Rich Quick Wallingford (1931) - Mr. Tuttle
Skyline (1931) - Judge West
Girls About Town (1931) - Simms
Ladies of the Jury (1932) - Judge Henry Fish
Grand Hotel (1932) - Meierheim
Madame Racketeer (1932) - James Butterworth
The First Year (1932) - Fred Livingston
Movie Crazy (1932) - Wesley Kitterman - Producer
Back Street (1932) - Uncle Felix
Flaming Gold (1932) - Bill Conway
Once in a Lifetime (1932) - Mr. Walker (uncredited)
The Phantom of Crestwood (1932) - Herbert Walcott
I Am a Fugitive from a Chain Gang (1932) - F.E. Ramsey
The Match King (1932) - Mr. Larsen
Hard to Handle (1933) - Charles Reeves
Ladies They Talk About (1933) - District Attorney Walter Simpson
42nd Street (1933) - Jones
Pick-Up (1933) - Jerome Turner
The Big Cage (1933) - Henry Cameron
Heroes for Sale (1933) - Dr. Briggs
Tugboat Annie (1933) - Mayor of Secoma (uncredited)
The Solitaire Man (1933) - Mr. Arthur Peabody
I Loved a Woman (1933) - Larkin
The Kennel Murder Case (1933) - District Attorney Markham
Only Yesterday (1933) - Harvey Miles
The Prizefighter and the Lady (1933) - Adopted Son
Fog (1933) - Alonzo Holt
Cross Country Cruise (1934) - The Grouch
The Countess of Monte Cristo (1934) - Hotel Manager
Hold That Girl (1934) - McCloy
Let's Be Ritzy (1934) - Splevin
Thirty-Day Princess (1934) - Managing Editor
Operator 13 (1934) - Col. Sharpe
Midnight Alibi (1934) - Senator
The Dragon Murder Case (1934) - Markham
The Lemon Drop Kid (1934) - Mr. Griggsby
No Ransom (1934) - John Winfield
Gridiron Flash (1934) - Man Whose Home is Robbed (scenes deleted)
The President Vanishes (1934) - Vice President Robert Molleson
College Rhythm (1934) - Herman Whimple
The County Chairman (1935) - Tom Craden
Society Doctor (1935) - Harris Snowden
Straight from the Heart (1935) - Boss Tim Reglan
Mary Jane's Pa (1935) - John Wagner
The Healer (1935) - Mr. Bradshaw (Joan's father)
Here Comes the Band (1935) - Judge
Diamond Jim (1935) - A.E. Moore
Cappy Ricks Returns (1935) - Alden 'Cappy' Ricks
His Night Out (1935) - Davis
Frisco Kid (1935) - Judge Crawford
Anything Goes (1936) - Elisha J. Whitney
Next Time We Love (1936) - Frank Carteret
Moonlight Murder (1936) - Police Chief Quinlan
Early to Bed (1936) - Burgess Frisbie
Bunker Bean (1936) - J.C. Kent
High Tension (1936) - Willard Stone
Old Hutch (1936) - Mr. Jolly
15 Maiden Lane (1936) - John Graves
Mr. Cinderella (1936) - Mr. J.J. Gates
We're on the Jury (1937) - Judge Henry Prime
California Straight Ahead! (1937) - Corrigan
The Good Old Soak (1937) - Webster Parsons
Mountain Justice (1937) - Horace Bamber - Lawyer
This Is My Affair (1937) - Admiral Dewey
On Such a Night (1937) - Colonel Fentridge
Of Human Hearts (1938) - Dr. Lupus Crumm
Gold Is Where You Find It (1938) - Mr. Crouch (final film role)

References

External links

1872 births
1938 deaths
American male film actors
Burials at Rosehill Cemetery
20th-century American male actors
Male actors from Buffalo, New York
American male stage actors